William Leeder may refer to:
 William Henry Leeder, early settler in the Swan River Colony, Western Australia
 William George Leeder, his son, mayor of Newcastle, Western Australia